Enteral respiration, also referred to as cloacal respiration or intestinal respiration, is a form of respiration in which gas exchange occurs in the posterior cavity of the enteral system. This is used in various species as an accessory respiration mechanism in hypoxic environments as a means to supplement blood oxygen.

Turtles

Some turtles, especially those specialized in diving, are highly reliant on cloacal respiration during dives. They accomplish this by having a pair of accessory air bladders connected to the cloaca which can absorb oxygen from the water.

Other animals
Various fish, as well as polychaete worms and even crabs, are specialized to take advantage of the constant flow of water through the cloacal respiratory tree of sea cucumbers while simultaneously gaining the protection of living within the sea cucumber itself. At night, many of these species emerge from the anus of the sea cucumber in search of food.

The pond loach is able to respond to the periodic drying in their native habitats by burrowing into the mud and exchanging gas through the posterior end of their alimentary canal.

Studies have shown that mammals are capable of performing intestinal respiration to a limited degree in a laboratory setting. Mice were subjected to hypoxic conditions and supplied oxygen through their intestines survived an average of 18 minutes compared to 11 minutes in the control group. When the intestinal lining was abraded before oxygen was introduced, most of the animals survived for at least 50 minutes. Investigations are planned regarding the effectiveness of the strategy, the safety of this application of perfluorocarbons, and the feasibility of application to humans.

See also
 Cutaneous respiration

References

Respiration
Animal anatomy
Digestive system